Barakeh, also spelt Barakah and Birkah, is a Syrian village in Al-Ziyarah Nahiyah in Al-Suqaylabiyah District, Hama. It lies on the western edge of Al-Ghab plain. According to the Syria Central Bureau of Statistics (CBS), Barakeh had a population of 295 in the 2004 census.

References 

Populated places in al-Suqaylabiyah District